Izium Raion is a raion (district) in Kharkiv Oblast of Ukraine. Its administrative center is the city of Izium. Population: 

On 18 July 2020, as part of the administrative reform of Ukraine, the number of raions of Kharkiv Oblast was reduced to seven, and the area of Izium Raion was significantly expanded. Three abolished raions – Balakliia, Barvinkove, and Borova Raions – and the city of Izium, which was previously incorporated as a city of oblast significance and did not belong to the raion, were merged into Izium Raion.

The pre-reform January 2020 estimate of the raion population was

Subdivisions

Current
After the reform in July 2020, the raion consisted of 8 hromadas:
 Balakliia urban hromada with the administration in the city of Balakliia, transferred from Balakliia Raion;
 Barvinkove urban hromada with the administration in the city of Barvinkove, transferred from Barvinkove Raion;
 Borova settlement hromada with the administration in the urban-type settlement of Borova, transferred from Borova Raion; 
 Donets settlement hromada with the administration in the urban-type settlement of Donets, transferred from Balakliia Raion;
 Izium urban hromada with the administration in the city of Izium, transferred from the city of oblast significance of Izium;
 Kunie rural hromada with the administration in the village of Kunie, retained from Izium Raion;
 Oskil rural hromada with the administration in the village of Oskil, retained from Izium Raion;
 Savyntsi settlement hromada with the administration in the urban-type settlement of Savyntsi, transferred from Balakliia Raion.

Before 2020

Before the 2020 reform, the raion consisted of two hromadas:
 Kunie rural hromada with the administration in Kunie;
 Oskil rural hromada with the administration in Oskil.

Silrada

References

Raions of Kharkiv Oblast
1923 establishments in Ukraine